Val Raymond Heim (November 4, 1920 – November 21, 2019)  was a left fielder who played in Major League Baseball during the  season.

Born in Plymouth, Wisconsin, Heim was one of many baseball players whose careers were interrupted by World War II. Heim was signed by the Chicago White Sox in 1940 and immediately was assigned to their minor league system. He posted a combined .328 batting average for two teams in 1941, gaining a promotion to the White Sox late in 1942. In 1942, Heim hit .200 (9-for-45) with six runs and seven runs batted in for Chicago in thirteen games, including one stolen base and a .294 on-base percentage. He joined the U.S. Navy at the end of the season.

Following his military discharge, Heim played in 1946 and 1948 in the White Sox minor league system, but he never appeared in a major league game again. In a five-year minor league career, he batted .285 and hit 35 home runs in 570 games. Following the death of Tom Jordan, he was recognized as the oldest living major league ballplayer. Heim died November 21, 2019, in his hometown of Superior, Nebraska.

References

External links

Major League Baseball left fielders
Chicago White Sox players
Jonesboro White Sox players
Milwaukee Brewers (minor league) players
Shreveport Sports players
Waterloo Hawks (baseball) players
Waterloo White Hawks players
West Palm Beach Indians players
Baseball players from Wisconsin
People from Plymouth, Wisconsin
United States Navy personnel of World War II
Military personnel from Wisconsin
1920 births
2019 deaths